Martyn Robin Sperrin (born 6 December 1956) is an English retired semi-professional footballer who made one appearance as a forward in the Football League for Luton Town. He played most of his career in non-League football for Edgware Town, Barnet, Hendon, Wealdstone, Ware, Bishop's Stortford, Stevenage Borough and Hertford Town.

Personal life 
Sperrin is the son of footballer Billy Sperrin. He runs a kitchen showroom in Sawbridgeworth.

Career statistics

References 

1956 births
Living people
English footballers
English Football League players
Footballers from Edmonton, London
Association football forwards
Isthmian League players
Edgware Town F.C. players
Barnet F.C. players
Hendon F.C. players
Wealdstone F.C. players
Bishop's Stortford F.C. players
Hertford Town F.C. players
Stevenage F.C. players
Southern Football League players
National League (English football) players